Egyptair Express was a regional airline based in Cairo, Egypt. It was a wholly owned subsidiary of the state-owned Egyptair, established in 2006 to offer passengers increased frequencies on domestic and regional routes through the use of smaller aircraft.
The airline had been a member of Star Alliance, through the membership of its parent company, Egyptair, since July 2008. On 4 November 2019, it was merged with its parent Egyptair as part of a restructuring plan.

History
Egyptair Express was created in May 2006 and launched operations on 1 June 2007.

In January 2018, it was announced that the airline would open a base at Sharm El Sheikh International Airport for its incoming fleet of Airbus A220-300s, this would increase the amount of destinations served by the airline at the airport with the possibility of operating to cities in Italy, Germany, Morocco and India non-stop.

As of 4 November 2019, as part of Aviation Minister Air Marshal Younes Hamed's restructuring plan, Egyptair Express has been completely merged with Egyptair, its parent company. It continued to operate the Embraer E170 which was gradually being sold at a rate of one per month, being replaced by the Airbus A220 operated by Egyptair mainline. It ceased operations in June 2020 after selling the last Embraer E170

Corporate affairs
The key trends for Egyptair Express are shown below (as at year ending 30 June). Figures for the years ending 30 June 2011 and 2012 (*) were delayed because of disruption caused by the Egyptian Revolution in early 2011, and the figures themselves reflect the disruption that occurred.

Destinations
Egyptair Express served the following destinations as of October 2019:

Historical fleet

As of November 2019, prior to the merger into its parent, the Egyptair Express fleet consisted of the following aircraft:

References

External links

EgyptAir
Defunct airlines of Egypt
Airlines established in 2006
Airlines disestablished in 2019
2006 establishments in Egypt
2019 disestablishments in Egypt
Egyptian brands
Egyptian companies established in 2006